Washington County Airport  is a county-owned, public-use airport in Washington County, Missouri, United States. It is located three nautical miles (6 km) east of the central business district of Potosi, Missouri,.

Facilities and aircraft 
Washington County Airport covers an area of 120 acres (49 ha) at an elevation of 959 feet (292 m) above mean sea level. It has one runway designated 2/20 with an asphalt surface measuring 4,000 by 60 feet (1,219 x 18 m).

For the 12-month period ending June 30, 2011, the airport had 1,040 aircraft operations, an average of 86 per month: 96% general aviation, 3% air taxi, and 1% military. At that time there were 11 aircraft based at this airport: 82% single-engine and 18% ultralight.

References

External links 
 Washington County Airport (8WC) at Missouri DOT Airport Directory
 Aerial image as of March 1996 from USGS The National Map
 
 

Airports in Missouri
Transportation in Washington County, Missouri